DFA (short for Duty Free Area) is an Italian progressive rock band from Verona, Italy. Their musical style is varied, but has elements of "space rock" bands such as Pink Floyd and jazz-rock fusion bands like Nova or In Cahoots.

Personnel
 Alberto DeGrandis (drums/vocals)
 Luca Baldassari (bass)
 Alberto Bonomi (keyboards/vocals)
 Silvio Minella (guitars)
 Roberto Tommasini (keyboards 1991–1995)

Discography
 Lavori in Corso ("Work in Progress") (Scolopedra, 1997)
 Duty Free Area (Mellow Records, Italy, October 1998)
 Kaleidoscope (Moonjune Records, 2000) First two albums remastered with three new live tracks
 Work in Progress—Live (Moonjune Records, 2001) recorded live on June 21, 2000, at the NEARFest at Lehigh University in Pennsylvania
 4th (MoonJune Records, 2008)

Disambiguation 

The Italian progressive rock band D.F.A. is not related to DFA Records, the Canadian indie-synth rock band Death from Above 1979, Los Angeles metal band Dark Fuckin' Angel or the German electro-punk band D.A.F. (Deutsch Amerikanische Freundschaft).

References and reviews
http://gnosis2000.net/reviews/dfa.htm
http://www.reviewcentre.com/reviews140287.html
https://web.archive.org/web/20080222195242/http://www.progreviews.com/reviews/display.php?rev=dfa-wipl

External links
 My Space site
 Official website

Italian progressive rock groups